Leiostyla filicum is a species of land snail in the family Lauriidae. It is endemic to Madeira Island in the Madeira archipelago.

This snail is limited to two river valleys on the island, where it occurs in laurisilva habitat. It lives in leaf litter in moist spots, sometimes next to waterfalls. Its habitat lies within Parque Natural da Madeira, a protected area.

References

Endemic fauna of Madeira
Molluscs of Madeira
Leiostyla
Gastropods described in 1986
Taxonomy articles created by Polbot